A list of films produced in Egypt in 1932. For an A-Z list of films currently on Wikipedia, see :Category:Egyptian films.

External links
 Egyptian films of 1932 at the Internet Movie Database
 Egyptian films of 1932 elCinema.com

Lists of Egyptian films by year
1932 in Egypt
Lists of 1932 films by country or language